Olearia calcarea, commonly known as limestone daisy bush, is a species of flowering plant in the family Asteraceae and is endemic to southern continental Australia. It is a shrub with egg-shaped or broadly spoon-shaped leaves with toothed edges, and white and yellow, daisy-like inflorescences.

Description 
The leaves are more or less sessile, both surfaces a similar colour. Flowering occurs from May to October and the fruit is a silky-hairy achene, the pappus with 74 to 84 bristles in two rows.

Taxonomy 
Olearia calcarea was first formally described in 1867 by George Bentham in Flora Australiensis from an unpublished description by Ferdinand von Mueller. The specific epithet (calcarea) means "limy", referring to the soil.

Distribution and habitat 
Limestone daisy bush grows in on mallee woodland on limestone-rich soils in southern Western Australia, southern South Australia, far north-western Victoria and west of Nymagee in far western New South Wales.

References

calcarea
Flora of Western Australia
Flora of South Australia
Flora of Victoria (Australia)
Flora of New South Wales
Taxa named by George Bentham
Plants described in 1867